The Pearl Rocks are a group of rocks covering an area  by  close to the west coast of Tower Island in the Palmer Archipelago of Antarctica. The name was given by Falkland Islands and Dependencies Aerial Survey Expedition (FIDASE) (1955–57) and is descriptive of the numerous snow-covered rocks in the group.

Important Bird Area
The site has been identified as an Important Bird Area (IBA) by BirdLife International because it supports a breeding colony of about 170 pairs of Antarctic shags.

References

Rock formations of the Palmer Archipelago
Important Bird Areas of Antarctica
Seabird colonies